John Stewart (c.1723–81), of York Buildings, Buckingham Street, London and Mitcham, Surrey, was an English politician.

He was a Member (MP) of the Parliament of Great Britain for Arundel 13 May 1771 – 1774.

References

1720s births
1781 deaths
18th-century English people
People from Westminster
People from Mitcham
Members of the Parliament of Great Britain for English constituencies
British MPs 1768–1774